Robert Dados (15 February 1977 in Poland – 30 March 2004 in Lublin, Poland) was a Polish speedway rider who won the World Under-21 title in 1998.

Speedway Grand Prix results

Career 
 Individual World Championship
 1998 - 33rd place (1 point)
 1999 - 21st place (20 points)
 2003 - 39th place (3 points)
 Individual World U-21 Championship
 1998 - World Champion (14 points +3)
 Team World Championship
 1998 - 4th place (2 points)
 Individual Polish Championship
 1999 - 6th place
 2001 - 6th place
 2002 - 16th place
 Individual U-21 Polish Championship
 1995 - 14th place
 1997 - 16th place
 1998 - Polish Champion
 Polish Pairs Championship
 1997 - 6th place
 1999 - 7th place
 2000 - 7th place
 2002 - 6th place
 Polish U-21 Pairs Championship
 1994 - 6th place
 1995 - 7th place
 1997 - 4th place
 1998 - 5th place
 Team Polish Championship
 2001 - 2nd place
 2002 - 2nd place
 Team U-21 Polish Championship
 1998 - Polish Champion
 1999 - 3rd place
 Golden Helmet
 1997 - 16th place
 1998 - 5th place
 1999 - 7th place
 2002 - 11th place
 Silver Helmet (U-21)
 1995 - track reserve
 1997 - 4th place
 1998 - 12th place
 Bronze Helmet (U-19)
 1995 - 4th place
 Team Polish Cup
 2001 - 2nd place

See also 
 Poland national speedway team
 List of Speedway Grand Prix riders
 List of suicides

References 

1977 births
2004 suicides
Polish speedway riders
Suicides by hanging in Poland
People from Lublin County
Sportspeople from Lublin Voivodeship
2004 deaths